Hans Rebane ( – 16 December 1961) was an Estonian politician, diplomat and journalist. He served as the Minister of Foreign Affairs of Estonia from 1927 to 1928 in Jaan Tõnisson's third cabinet. Rebane was Estonian envoy in Helsinki 1931–1937, 1937–1940 in Riga.

Hans Rebane was born in Ärma farmstead, Halliste Parish (now in Veskimäe, Viljandi Parish), Viljandi County. The same farm is now owned by the former Estonian President Toomas Hendrik Ilves who uses it as his residence. 

Hans Rebane studied medicine in the University of Tartu and later economics in Berlin.

He died in Stockholm.

References

1882 births
1961 deaths
People from Mulgi Parish
People from the Governorate of Livonia
Farmers' Assemblies politicians
Ministers of Foreign Affairs of Estonia
Members of the Riigikogu, 1926–1929
Envoys of Estonia
University of Tartu alumni
Estonian emigrants to Sweden
Estonian World War II refugees